Manhattan (YTB‑779/YT-800) is a United States Navy  named for Manhattan, New York.

Construction

The contract for Manhattan was awarded 31 January 1964. She was laid down on 1 October 1964 at Marinette, Wisconsin, by Marinette Marine and launched 15 July 1965.

Operational history

Assigned to the Pacific Fleet, Manhattan transited the Panama Canal and steamed to Hawaii for duty in the US Naval Shipyard at Pearl Harbor.

Manhattan served in Viet Nam between November 1966 and September 1968.

After Viet Nam, Manhattan was assigned to Naval Submarine Base Bangor.

Stricken from the Navy Directory 1 October 2004, Manhattan was sold by the Defense Reutilization and Marketing Service (DRMS), 23 August 2005, to Grant Westmoreland, LMW Investments Inc. for $151,888.

Ex-Manhattan was converted to twin z-drive and reacquired by the US Navy, 7 October 2008 and was designated as unnamed yard tug YT-800.

Notes

References

External links
 
  – name misspelled at ABS

Natick-class large harbor tugs
Ships built by Marinette Marine
1965 ships